Robert David Yeoman,  (born March 10, 1951) is an American cinematographer, best known for his collaborations with directors Wes Anderson and Paul Feig. He was nominated for an Academy Award and a BAFTA Award for The Grand Budapest Hotel (2014), and has won numerous other awards including an Independent Spirit Award.

Life and career
Born in Erie, Pennsylvania, Yeoman spent his childhood in the northern suburbs of Chicago. He received a Bachelor of Arts from Duke University in 1973 and a Master of Fine Arts from the University of Southern California School of Cinematic Arts in 1979.

Yeoman's first filmwork was done as a second unit director of photography on To Live and Die in LA, directed by William Friedkin in 1986. He went on to shoot many independent films including Gus Van Sant's Drugstore Cowboy — for which he won the Independent Spirit Award for Best Cinematography — Noah Baumbach's The Squid and the Whale, Roman Coppola's CQ and Kevin Smith's Dogma. He has worked on every live action feature film by Wes Anderson, including Bottle Rocket (1996), Rushmore (1998), and The Royal Tenenbaums (2001) as cinematographer, as well as The Life Aquatic with Steve Zissou (2004), The Darjeeling Limited (2007), Moonrise Kingdom (2012) and The Grand Budapest Hotel (2014), credited as director of photography. He was nominated for an Academy Award for Best Cinematography for his work on The Grand Budapest Hotel.

Yeoman is a member of the American Society of Cinematographers.

Style

Yeoman frequently collaborates with director Wes Anderson. His style in Anderson's films consists of using color palettes to highlight the colors of the set and costumes. Anderson and Yeoman shoot the movies with film stock, anamorphic lenses, soft lighting, and theater-like composition, giving the distinctive visuals for which Anderson's films are known.

Filmography

Film 

Other credits

Television
TV movies

TV series

Awards and nominations

Notes

References

External links
 
 Robert Yeoman at the Internet Encyclopedia of Cinematographers

1951 births
American cinematographers
Duke University alumni
Independent Spirit Award winners
Living people
USC School of Cinematic Arts alumni
Artists from Erie, Pennsylvania